The Pierre Radisson-class icebreakers, also known as R-class icebreakers, are a class of four icebreakers constructed for and operated by the Canadian Coast Guard. The Canadian Coast Guard designates the four ships in the class as medium icebreakers. The fourth,  was built to a modified design and is considered a subclass, the Improved R-class icebreaker. Franklin was later renamed Sir John Franklin before undergoing a re-design for use primarily as an Arctic research vessel. Upon the vessel's return to service, the ship was once again renamed . All the vessels are named for people who sailed through Canada's northern waters. The class operates in the Arctic Ocean in the summer, patrolling, icebreaking and research missions.

Design and description

The Pierre Radisson class were designed for Coast Guard operations in the Arctic Ocean.

The vessel is propelled by two fixed-pitch propellers and one bow thruster powered by a diesel-electric system comprising six Alco M251F diesel engines that when driving the shafts create  and six GEC generators creating 11.1 megawatts sustained powering two motors that when driving the shafts create . The vessel is also equipped with one Caterpillar 398 emergency generator.

Pierre Radisson is equipped with a Sperry navigational radar operating on the E/F and I bands. The icebreaker has a flight deck and hangar which originally accommodated a MBB Bo 105 or Bell 206L light helicopter, but currently supports the Bell 429 GlobalRanger and Bell 412EPI which were acquired by the Canadian Coast Guard in the 2010s to replace the older helicopters. The ship can carry  of aviation fuel for the helicopters. The vessel is certified as  Arctic Class 3 and has a complement of 31 with 11 officers and 20 crew.

Improved R class

Classified as a Medium Gulf/River Icebreaker by the Canadian Coast Guard, Henry Larsen was ordered to a modified design from the rest of the class. The vessel's hull form differs from her classmates, with a differently-shaped bow with a raised forecastle and underwater "ice knife". The vessel also has a different propulsion system. Furthermore, the ship has a Wärtsilä air-bubbling system installed to allow the vessel to reduce hull friction and more easily break ice. Henry Larsen displaces  at full load.

The ship is propelled by two fixed-pitch propellers driven by a diesel-electric system comprising two GE AC electric motors and three Wärtsilä Vasa 16V32 diesel engines.

The icebreaker is equipped with a Sperry Marine Bridgemaster navigational radar. Henry Larsen has a flight deck and hangar located at the stern of the ship which originally accommodated a MBB Bo 105 or Bell 206L light helicopter, but currently supports the Bell 429 GlobalRanger and Bell 412EPI which were acquired by the Canadian Coast Guard in the 2010s to replace the older helicopters. The ship can carry  of aviation fuel for the helicopters. The vessel is certified as Arctic Class 4 and has a complement of 31 with 11 officers and 20 crew and 40 additional berths. The vessel is also equipped with a hospital ward.

Amundsen modifications
In 2003, Sir John Franklin was reactivated and transformed into a hybrid science ship. Part of the vessel's storage holds were transformed into laboratory space. The refit included the addition of a moon pool, which enables scientists to lower scientific instruments from inside the hull without cutting a hole in the ice, multi-beam sonar, the replacement of heating and electrical systems, and installation of state-of-the-art scientific equipment.

Ships in class

Service history
The first three ships entered service between 1977 and 1982. Pierre Radisson, the first ship of the class, underwent sea trials while transiting the Northwest Passage en route to Quebec City. During the transit, Pierre Radisson assisted  which had been severely damaged by ice in the western Arctic. After completion, Franklin, the second ship of the class, performed sea trials in the western Arctic and Northwest Passage. The two ships then transited to the East Coast of Canada via the Panama Canal. In 1980, the vessel was renamed to Sir John Franklin at the request of the crew. In 1983, Des Groseilliers, the third vessel in the class, made her first voyage to the Arctic.

In April 1984, after the opening of the navigation season on the Saint Lawrence Seaway and the Great Lakes, the area froze up, driving six cargo ships ashore and a further eighteen became stuck in the ice. Five icebreakers were assigned to aid the merchant vessels, however, they proved unable to meet the task.

In 1987, Sir John Franklin escorted the Arctic cargo ship/oil tanker  to Nanisivik. In July 1989, the icebreaker again attempted to transit the Northwest Passage but was forced to break off the attempt after ice conditions were found to be too severe. In June 1994, at the height of the Turbot War, Sir John Franklin was among the Coast Guard vessels sent to monitor the European fishing fleets on the Grand Banks. The ship was kept just out of sight but within radar range of foreign fishing trawlers. These actions led to the detainment and seizure of the Spanish fishing trawler Estai.

In 1988, Henry Larsen joined the fleet. On the ship's maiden voyage from Victoria, British Columbia to Dartmouth, Nova Scotia, the vessel transited the Northwest Passage, performing sea trials on the trip. Following the 1995 transfer of the Canadian Coast Guard from the Department of Transport to the Department of Fisheries and Oceans, Sir John Franklin was deemed surplus to the fleet in 1996. In August 2003 after funding was received for the new dedicated research vessel, and Sir John Franklin was taken to Les Mechins, Quebec to be refitted as a research ship. The ship reentered service that year and was renamed Amundsen.

As part of the Surface Heat Budget of the Arctic Ocean (SHEBA) experiment in 1997, Louis S. St-Laurent and Des Groseilliers sailed through the Northwest Passage to meet  in Alaskan waters. Sir Wilfrid Laurier then escorted Des Groseilliers to a point where Des Groseillierss engines were shut off on 2 October and the ship was left with a minimum crew and a group of international scientists. The vessel was then left to drift in the pack ice for a year and dubbed "Ice Station SHEBA".

Pierre Radisson participated in Operation Nanook in 2008 and 2009, annual joint training exercises with elements of the Canadian Forces to conduct sovereignty and disaster patrols in the Canadian Arctic. In 2011, it was announced that an image of Amundsen would be placed on the backside of the new Canadian 50 Dollar polymer banknote. This was intended to mark Canada's northern frontier and arctic research In September 2013, Henry Larsen was sent to aid sister ship Amundsen in recovering a MBB Bo 155 helicopter that had deployed from Amundsen and crashed near Banks Island killing three crew members including Amundsens master. In August 2014, Henry Larsen participated in Operation Nanook.

References

Citations

Sources
 
 
 

 
Icebreakers of the Canadian Coast Guard
 
Auxiliary icebreaker classes